Gaurav Kochar (born 17 September 1992) is an Indian cricketer. He made his List A debut for Services in the 2016–17 Vijay Hazare Trophy on 28 February 2017.

References

External links
 

1992 births
Living people
Indian cricketers
Services cricketers
Cricketers from Delhi